HMCS Chignecto (hull number MCB 160) was a  that served in the Royal Canadian Navy during the Cold War. Entering service in 1957, the minesweeper was used primarily as a training vessel on the Pacific coast of Canada. Discarded in 1998, the ship was broken up in 1999.

Design and description
The Bay class were designed and ordered as replacements for the Second World War-era minesweepers that the Royal Canadian Navy operated at the time.

They had a complement of 38 officers and ratings.

The Bay-class minesweepers were powered by two GM 12-cylinder diesel engines driving two shafts creating . The ships were armed with one 40 mm Bofors gun and were equipped with minesweeping gear.

Operational history
Ordered as a replacement for sister ship,  which had been transferred to the French Navy in 1954, the ship's keel was laid down on 25 October 1955 by George T. Davie & Sons Ltd. at their yard in Lauzon, Quebec. Named for a bay located between Nova Scotia and New Brunswick, Chignecto was launched on 17 November 1956. The ship was commissioned on 1 August 1957.

After commissioning, the minesweeper was transferred to the West Coast of Canada and joined Training Group Pacific. In 1972, the class was redesignated patrol escorts. The vessel remained a part of the unit until being paid off on 19 December 1998. Chignecto was purchased by The Boat Company of Poulsbo, WA for use as an eco tourism vessel but the USCG would not permit another "T" boat conversion (They had two ex mine sweepers already). The Engines and transmissions, (Clevelands),all 316 stainless steel, were removed at Anacortes, WA and used in the construction of a new vessel, the "Mist Cove" The remainder of Chignecto'' was sold to Budget Steel of Victoria, British Columbia in May 1999 and broken up for scrap.

References

Notes

Citations

References
 
 
 
 
 

 

Bay-class minesweepers
Ships built in Quebec
1956 ships
Cold War minesweepers of Canada
Minesweepers of the Royal Canadian Navy